A conche is an agitator that evenly distributes cocoa butter within chocolate.

Conche may also refer to:

 Conche, Newfoundland and Labrador, Canada
 Lac de Conche, a lake in Switzerland
 Laghetto delle Conche, a lake on the island of Elba, Italy

People with the surname
 Marcel Conche (1922-2022), French philosopher

See also
 Conch